Isaac Freeman III (born August 6, 1971), better known by his stage name Fatman Scoop, is an American rapper, promoter and radio personality famed for his on-stage rough, raw loud voice.

Career
Fatman Scoop first came to prominence with the release of single "Be Faithful", which topped the charts in the United Kingdom and the Republic of Ireland in October 2003, and peaked within the top ten of the charts in Denmark and Australia. The song had been a favorite in clubs around the world for years but it took two years to clear the samples from Jay-Z, Black Sheep, Queen Pen, The Beatnuts and Faith Evans. He has also collaborated with numerous artists, such as Lil Jon, Mariah Carey, Janet Jackson, Whitney Houston, Pitbull and Skrillex, among others.

In 2004, he featured in the UK TV series, Chancers, broadcast on Channel 4, mentoring six British musicians trying to achieve success in the United States.

Fatman Scoop also has his own ice cream parlor and relationship show/podcast. All episodes can also be seen on the Man and Wife channel on internet TV network, ONLOQ.com, as well as MTV. He also appeared as himself on the TV series The Boondocks (season 2, episode 5, "The Story of Thugnificent" and episode 15, "The Story of Gangstalicious Part 2", from the same season); however since the show premiered, the relationship between Fatman Scoop and his wife soured and they subsequently divorced.

Fatman Scoop was interviewed by radio personality Madison Jaye in a YouTube video that was published on March 22, 2014. During the interview, Fatman Scoop reveals that he received his stage name when he was a baby from his Uncle Jack, who would call him "Fatman Scoop" because he loved to eat ice cream. People had thought that he received his stage name after appearing in the Fugees' "Killing Me Softly" video as a cinema worker serving popcorn and ice-cream. Lauryn Hill was a massive ice-cream fan herself so she would shout 'scoop, scoop, Fatman Scoop' when she wanted a tub of her favorite snack. But Fatman Scoop stated "I was already Fatman Scoop on the radio when that video came out."

On August 27, 2015, he entered the Celebrity Big Brother 16: UK vs. USA house in the United Kingdom as a contestant. On September 14, he was the third housemate to be evicted, on day 20 where he finished in 11th place.

Personal life
In July 2006, a club promoter in New Bern, North Carolina sued the Sheriff of Craven County, North Carolina after a 2003 concert held there was shut down by the sheriff due to a noise complaint. The suit asked for more than $10,000 (US$) in lost wages and punitive damages.

Fatman Scoop has two children: a boy and a girl. He is divorced.

Discography

Compilation albums
 Fatman Scoop's Party Breaks: Volume 1 (2003)
 In the Club (2006)
 Party King (2015, Japan only)

Singles

Featured singles
2001: "Drop" (Timbaland & Magoo featuring Fatman Scoop)
2005: "Lose Control" (Missy Elliott featuring Ciara and Fatman Scoop)
2006: "Take the Lead (Wanna Ride)" (Bone Thugs-n-Harmony and Wisin & Yandel featuring Melissa Jiménez and Fatman Scoop)
2006: "When I Were a Lad (Many Moons Ago)" (Association of Zoos and Aquariums featuring Fatman Scoop)
2006: "Let's Ride" (Chingy featuring Fatman Scoop)
2007: "Behind the Cow" (Scooter featuring Fatman Scoop)
2007: "Layaway Love" (Notch featuring Fatman Scoop)
2008: "Turn Around" (The Crooklyn Clan featuring Fatman Scoop and Afroman)
2008: "Be Faithful" (Welsh Transport Regiment featuring Fatman Scoop)
2009: "Just a Little Bit" (Claudia Cream featuring Fatman Scoop)
2009: "Think About Letting Go" (Fedde Le Grand featuring Fatman Scoop)
2009: "Onslaught 2" (Slaughterhouse featuring Fatman Scoop)
2009: "Love Is Back" (David Guetta featuring Fatman Scoop)
2010: "Go Crazy"  (Art Beatz and Ariez Onasis featuring Fatman Scoop and Clinton Sparks)
2010: "That’s What’s Up" (Frauenarzt und Manny Marc featuring Fatman Scoop)
2010: "Gettin' Money" (Doesya featuring Fatman Scoop)
2010: "Stick It to the Man" (B*Witched featuring Fatman Scoop)
2010: "Please Don't Break My Heart" (Kalomoira featuring Fatman Scoop)
2010: "New Years Anthem" (The Disco Fries & DJ Class featuring Fatman Scoop)
2010: "I Wanna Get Drunk" (DJ Felli Fel featuring Three 6 Mafia, Lil Jon and Fatman Scoop)
2010: "The Situation" (Mike "The Situation" Sorrentino featuring The Disco Fries, DJ Class and Fatman Scoop)
2010: "Pop & Drop" (Joosuc featuring Fatman Scoop)
2011: "Drop It Low" (Kat Deluna featuring Fatman Scoop)
2011: "Shake It" (Kat Deluna featuring Fatman Scoop)
2011: "Feel the Love" (Marvin Priest featuring Fatman Scoop)
2011: "Wine De Best" (Orange Hill featuring Busy Signal, Fatman Scoop and Kano)
2011: "Umutsuz Vaka" (Demet Akalın featuring Fatman Scoop)
2011: "Rock the Boat" (Bob Sinclar featuring Fatman Scoop, Pitbull and Dragonfly)
2012: "Raise the Roof"  (Hampenberg and Alexander Brown featuring Fatman Scoop, Pitbull and Nabiha)
2012: "Bad Girl" (Oun-P featuring Remo The Hitmaker and Fatman Scoop)
2012: "Tonight I'm Your DJ" (Ida Corr featuring Fatman Scoop)
2013: "Crash This Party" (Alex Young featuring Fatman Scoop)
2014: "Recess"  (Skrillex and Kill the Noise featuring Fatman Scoop and Michael Angelakos) UK Number 57
2014: "Here We Go Now!"  (Tropkillaz & SNAVS featuring Fatman Scoop)
2015: "SQUAD OUT!"  (Skrillex and Jauz featuring Fatman Scoop)
2015: "Don't Stop the Madness"  (Hardwell and W&W featuring Fatman Scoop)
2014/2016/2017: "Bass Dunk"  (Charlotte Devaney featuring Fatman Scoop and Lady Leshurr
2017: "Space Jam"  (Makj & Michael Sparks featuring Fatman Scoop)
2018: "Level Up"  (Ciara featuring Missy Elliott and Fatman Scoop)
2019: "Wild"  (Vinai featuring Fatman Scoop)
2019: "Left Right"  (Hardwell, Deorro and Makj featuring Fatman Scoop)
2020: "Make Some Noise"  (Wolfpack and Mike Bond featuring Fatman Scoop)
2021: "Stampede"  (Gammer featuring Fatman Scoop)
2022: "Pro Freak"  (Smino and Doechii featuring Fatman Scoop)

Awards and nominations

Awards
2005: Grammy Award for Best Rap Song - Nomination - ("Lose Control", with Missy Elliott & Ciara)
2005: Smash Hits Poll Winners Party - Star Of The Year - Won - (voted best overall personality in 2005 by Smash Hits readers)
2005: Grammy Award for Best Short Form Music Video - Won - ("Lose Control", with Missy Elliott & Ciara)
2006: Soul Train Music Award for Best R&B/Soul or Rap Dance Cut  - Won - ("Lose Control", with Missy Elliott & Ciara)

Collaborations
As a hype man for various artists, he has appeared and performed with a great number of other artists. Listed here are artists he has either done a song with, or in which he has appeared together with in a song:

Skrillex
Hardwell
Demet Akalın
DJ AM
The Beatnuts
Miri Ben-Ari
The Black Eyed Peas
Mary J. Blige
Bone Thugs-N-Harmony
Nick Cannon
Mariah Carey
Charlotte Devaney
Chingy
Ciara
Claudia Cream
Club Dogo
The Crooklyn Clan
Cypress Hill
Elephant Man
Missy Elliott
Exile
Far East Movement
Fat Joe
DJ Felli Fel
Frauenarzt
Funkmaster Flex
Girlicious
David Guetta
Hampenberg & Alexander Brown
Lauryn Hill
Whitney Houston
Janet Jackson
Wyclef Jean
Kalomira
Ken of Overground
DJ Kool
Lil Jon
Lumidee
Manny Marc
Massive Töne
Pras Michel
Michael Fall
MF Doom
MF Grimm
Machel Montano
N.O.R.E.
Notch
Kardinal Offishall
Sean Paul
Pitbull
Public Enemy
The Pussycat Dolls
Busta Rhymes
Kool Savas
Scooter
Bob Sinclar
Slaughterhouse
Mike "The Situation" Sorrentino
Clinton Sparks
Jauz
Swizz Beatz
Three 6 Mafia
Timbaland & Magoo
DJ Tomekk
Andy Stewart
T-Pain
Jasmine Trias
Wisin & Yandel
X-ecutioners
Yellow Claw
Ying Yang Twins
Joel Fletcher
Young Buck
Darin Zanyar

References

External links
 Official site
 Official Myspace

1971 births
Living people
African-American male rappers
Hip hop record producers
American dance musicians
Grammy Award winners
21st-century American rappers
21st-century American male musicians
21st-century African-American musicians
20th-century African-American people